Jerry Stephen Barnett (June 4, 1941 –  January 2, 2018) was an American football offensive lineman in the National Football League for the Chicago Bears and the Washington Redskins. He played college football at the University of Oregon and was drafted in the second round of the 1963 NFL Draft. Barnett was also selected in the ninth round of the 1963 AFL Draft by the San Diego Chargers.

1941 births
Living people
People from Sand Springs, Oklahoma
American football offensive linemen
Oregon Ducks football players
Chicago Bears players
Washington Redskins players